Ireland formerly had numerous narrow-gauge railways, most of which were built to a gauge of . The last (non-preserved) line to close was the West Clare Railway in 1961 (though it has been partially preserved).

railways

Northern Ireland

Operating
Foyle Valley Railway
Giant's Causeway and Bushmills Railway

Defunct

Republic of Ireland

Operating
Cavan and Leitrim Railway
Fintown Railway
Listowel and Ballybunion Railway
Stradbally Woodland Railway
Waterford and Suir Valley Railway
West Clare Railway
Note: The peat processing State enterprise, Bord na Mona, also operated narrow-gauge industrial (staff-only) railways on multiple bogs, and some may still be extant.

Defunct

gauge railways
Cork Electric Tramways and Lighting Company; opened 1898, closed 1931

gauge railways
Dublin and Lucan Electric Railway; opened 1900, closed 1925

gauge railways
Steam Train Express (located in the Emerald Park (formerly Tayto Park) theme park); opened 2015 (operating)

gauge railways
The St James's Gate Brewery narrow-gauge tramway, constructed 1873, closed 1975

gauge railways

Northern Ireland
Bellevue Park Railway (located in Bellevue Park); opened 1933, closed 1950 (defunct - park still operating)

Republic of Ireland
Difflin Lake Railway (located in Oakfield Park); opened 2003 (operating)

Monorails
Listowel and Ballybunion Railway; opened 1888, closed 1924; partially preserved

See also

History of rail transport in Ireland
List of heritage railways in Northern Ireland 
List of heritage railways in the Republic of Ireland
British narrow-gauge railways
Donegal Railway Heritage Centre

References

Narrow gauge railways in Ireland
Narrow gauge railways
Ireland, narrow